Auxiliary brake may refer to:

 Parking brake
 Emergency brake (train)